Mount Absalom is the southernmost and highest (1,640 m) mountain of the Herbert Mountains, in the central part of the Shackleton Range. It was first mapped in 1957 by the Commonwealth Trans-Antarctic Expedition and named for Henry W.L. Absalom, a member of the Scientific Committee on the Commonwealth Trans-Antarctic Expedition of 1955–58.

Mountains of Coats Land